SouthWood is a planned community located in Tallahassee, Florida.  The community is located on the southeast side of Tallahassee.  In the community is located the State of Florida Capital Circle Office Complex, Florida State University School, and John Paul II Catholic High School.

The  development, planned by Southwood Properties, the development subsidiary of the St. Joe Paper Company, was controversial, and was canceled in 1989 after the Florida Department of Community Affairs (DCA) required 40% affordable housing. A new plan for the same project, now being developed by St. Joe/Arvida, was approved by the city in 1999 and later by the DCA.

SouthWood is a part of the Capital Region Community Development District which is a local, special purpose government entity authorized by Chapter 190 of the Florida Statutes as amended, and created by the Florida Land and Water Adjudacatory Commission as an alternative method of planning, acquiring, operating and maintaining community-wide improvements in planned communities. A CDD provides the "solution" to Florida’s need to provide valuable community infrastructure generated by growth, ultimately without overburdening other governments and their taxpaying residents. Community Development Districts represent a major advancement in Florida’s effort to manage its growth effectively and efficiently. This allows a developer to establish higher construction standards, meanwhile providing a long-term solution to the operation and maintenance of the community’s facilities.

The Capital Region Community Development District is organized similar to other local governments in Florida, in that the legislative body is composed of a five-member board known as the Board of Supervisors. The Board establishes the policy of the District in accordance with Florida law. The Board, by law, must hire a District Administrator and District Counsel. Staff members operate utilizing the same formalities as a County Administrator and County Attorney. The Board, through review of advertised Requests for Qualifications, ranks and selects a District Engineer to perform the engineering needs of the District. District Administration staff and the District Attorney administer the operations of the District and implement the Board’s policies and contracts.

The current supervisors include four community residents and one developer appointee.

Chair:  Jennings DePriest...Term expires 2020
Vice-Chair: L.Kyle Rojas ...Term expires 2020
Secretary: Brain Kelly...Term Expires 2020
Asst. Secretary:. April Johnston..Term Expires 2020
Developer Rep: Jorge Gonzalez

See also
Florida State University School

References

External links
SouthWood
Pictures of SouthWood in Tallahassee
 http://www.capitalregioncdd.com/index.php

Planned communities in Florida
Neighborhoods in Tallahassee, Florida